John William "Jack" Horton (14 July 1905 – 22 October 1964), also known as Jackie Horton, was an English professional footballer who played as a forward.

Club career
Following an unsuccessful trial with Bury, Horton signed for Charlton Athletic in 1926. After six seasons, in which he scored 54 goals in 243 league appearances, Horton was nominated for the Charlton Athletic Hall of Fame in 2022. He joined Chelsea in 1933, and went on to score 15 goals in 59 appearances.

References

1905 births
1964 deaths
People from Castleford
English footballers
Association football forwards
Castleford Town F.C. players
Charlton Athletic F.C. players
Chelsea F.C. players
Crystal Palace F.C. players